Club Baloncesto Myrtia Murcia, also known as Real Murcia Baloncesto for sponsorship reasons, is a Spanish basketball team based in Murcia that currently plays in LEB Oro.

History
Local club Club Baloncesto Capuchinos, one of the main teams in Murcia, changed its name to Club Baloncesto Myrtia in 2013, with the aim to be a team where to continue playing for homegrown players.

In 2015, the club was admitted in Liga EBA and, in its first season, it qualified for the promotion playoffs to LEB Plata but failed in its attempt. In the next season, the club qualified to this stage as group champion and finally promoted on 21 July 2017, in the final stage played at their home arena.

In August 2017, the club agreed a collaboration contract with football club Real Murcia and would start using their name, their logo and their colors.

Season by season

Trophies and awards

Trophies
Liga EBA: (1)
2016–17

Players

Current roster

Depth chart

References

External links
Official website
Profile at FEB.es

Basketball teams in the Region of Murcia
LEB Plata teams
Former Liga EBA teams
Sport in Murcia
Real Murcia